This page includes the election results of the Yorkshire Party, a regional political party based in Yorkshire.

General election results

Summary

2015 United Kingdom general election
Yorkshire First had candidates standing in 14 parliamentary seats. None were elected.

By-elections, 2015–2017

2017 United Kingdom general election 
The Yorkshire Party nominated 21 candidates for the 2017 general election. The average age of candidates was 35 with the youngest, Jack Render, 19. 20% were LGBT. The party received 20,958 votes making it the 6th most voted-for party in England, ahead of National Health Action and other nationwide parties. None were elected and all lost their deposits, however notable individual results included gaining 3rd place in Don Valley, Doncaster Central, and Wakefield.

2019 United Kingdom general election 
The Yorkshire Party nominated 28 candidates for the 2019 general election and received 29,201 votes, an average of 1,043 per seat. While none were elected and all lost their deposits, the party's vote represented an increase on the previous 2017 general election, when the average vote per candidate was 998.

By-elections, 2019–present

Local election results

2015 United Kingdom local elections
In local elections, Yorkshire First won five seats on parish/town councils: Wayne Chadburn was elected unopposed to Penistone parish council, Tony and Eddie Devoy were elected in Brierley, and Bob Buxton was elected to Rawdon parish council. They joined Lee Walton, a former independent councillor in Hornsea, who joined Yorkshire First before the election and defended his seat in May 2015 as a Yorkshire First candidate.

Yorkshire First fielded 15 candidates. There were two candidates in Wakefield MDC, one in East Riding of Yorkshire CC, eight in Kingston-upon-Hull, three in Barnsley MDC  and one in Leeds MDC on 7 May 2015

A by-election was held for the Dearne North ward of Barnsley Metropolitan Borough Council on 27 August 2015 following the death of Labour Cllr Dave Sim. Tony Devoy, contested the Dearne North seat on Barnsley Council. He received 9.8% of the votes, 25 votes behind UKIP and over twice as many votes as the Conservatives. Labour held on to its safe seat.

2016 United Kingdom local elections 
On 5 May 2016, the party fielded 17 candidates across six local authorities: two in Barnsley, four in Calderdale, two in Rotherham, one in Sheffield and five in Wakefield.

2017 United Kingdom local elections 
The Yorkshire Party fielded seven ward candidates at the 2017 local elections: five for Doncaster Metropolitan Borough Council and two for North Yorkshire County Council. Also contesting the Doncaster mayoral election.

2018 United Kingdom local elections  
The Yorkshire Party fielded twenty four candidates at the 2018 local elections across nine local authorities, succeeding in winning six council seats.

2019 United Kingdom local elections  
The Yorkshire Party fielded thirty eight candidates at the 2019 local elections across nine local authorities, succeeding in winning six council seats.

2021 United Kingdom local elections  
The Yorkshire Party fielded forty four candidates at the 2021 local elections across twelve local authorities.

Mayoral election results

Directly elected mayor of Doncaster 
Chris Whitwood was the Yorkshire Party mayoral candidate in Doncaster in 2017. He saved his deposit.

Mayor of South Yorkshire
At the 2018 election for the newly created mayoral position, the Yorkshire Party was fourth out of seven candidates, beating the Green Party and English Democrats candidates. The party improved its performance at the following election in 2022, overtaking the Liberal Democrats into third place and narrowly missing out on a place in the second round of the vote to the Conservatives.

Mayor of West Yorkshire

European Parliament results

2014 European Parliament election
The European Parliament election was held in the UK on 22 May 2014.

2019 European Parliament election 
The European Parliament election was held in the UK for the final time on Thursday 23 May 2019.

References

Politics of Yorkshire
Regionalist parties in the United Kingdom
2014 establishments in England
Election results by party in the United Kingdom